is a passenger railway station located in the city of Kan'onji, Kagawa Prefecture, Japan. It is operated by JR Shikoku and has the station number "Y21".

Lines
Minoura Station is served by the JR Shikoku Yosan Line and is located 66.4 km from the beginning of the line at Takamatsu. Yosan line local, Rapid Sunport, and Nanpū Relay services stop at the station.

Layout
The station, which is unstaffed, consists of an island platform serving two tracks. A waiting room fabricated from a disused freight car has been set up by the tracks. Access to the island platform is by means of a level crossing. There is also a siding on the side of platform/track 1 which terminates in a locomotive shed.

Adjacent stations

History
At that time the station was operated by Japanese Government Railways, later becoming Japanese National Railways (JNR). With the privatization of JNR on 1 April 1987, control of the station passed to JR Shikoku.

Surrounding area
Japan National Route 11

See also
 List of railway stations in Japan

References

External links

 Station timetable

Railway stations in Kagawa Prefecture
Railway stations in Japan opened in 1916
Kan'onji, Kagawa